The Wonderful Wedding is a 2015 Taiwanese comedy film starring Chu Ke-liang, Ruby Lin, Li Dongxue, Kou Hsi-shun and Lin Mei-hsiu.  A meet-the-parents-of-fiancée comedy, it pokes fun at the cultural and linguistic differences between Kaohsiung in southern Taiwan and Beijing in northern China.

Typical for a comedy starring Chu Ke-liang, it was released a day before the Chinese New Year in Taiwan.

Plot
A protective father's unreasonable obsession with traditions nearly derails his daughter's wedding.

Cast
Chu Ke-liang as Li Jin Shuang
Ruby Lin as Li Shu Fen
Li Dongxue as Gao Fei
Kou Hsi-shun as Gao Shou
Lin Mei-hsiu as Qian Song Yi
Lin Mei-chao 
Akio Chen
Xia Yi as Zhang Jing
Huang Hsi Tien
Su Zhu
Wang Tsai-hua
Weather Girls
JJ Lin (Cameo)
Richie Jen (Cameo)
Lan Cheng-lung (Cameo)

Soundtrack
Both songs were written by Chen Kuo-hua.

Theme song 1: "Hoa Hee Lai Cha Cha" (歡喜來恰恰; "Happy, Come Cha-Cha")
Language: Hokkien
Performer: Jacky Chen, Ric, Daniel Luo, Kuo Chin-fa
Theme song 2: "Hao Xiang Hao Xiang Ni" (好想好想你; "Really, Really Miss You")
Language: Mandarin
Performer: 九九 Sophie Chen

Box office
The Wonderful Wedding was the top domestic film of the Chinese New Year holidays in Taiwan, breaking the NT$100 million (US$3.15 million) mark in 5 days.
The Wonderful Wedding made NT$54.96 million (US$1.74 million) in Taipei after four weekends.

References

External links

Official Facebook 
 Official trailer
 MV of theme song 1
 MV of theme song 2

Taiwanese comedy films
2015 comedy films
Films about weddings
Chinese New Year films